Fatah Kandi (also Romanized as Fatāḩ Kandī and Fattāḩ Kandī) is a village in Zangebar Rural District, in the Central District of Poldasht County, West Azerbaijan Province, Iran. At the 2006 census, its population was 255, in 61 families.

References 

Populated places in Poldasht County